The 2001–02 FIBA Saporta Cup was the thirty-sixth edition of FIBA's 2nd-tier level European-wide professional club basketball competition. It was the last edition of the tournament. It took place between 30 October 2001 and 30 April 1998. The final was held at Lyon, France.

Competition system
 24 teams (national domestic cup champions, plus the best qualified teams in the most important European national domestic leagues), entered a preliminary group stage, divided into four groups of six teams each, playing a round-robin. The final standing were based on individual wins and defeats. In case of a tie between two or more teams, after the group stage, the following criteria were used to decide the final classification: 1) number of wins in one-to-one games between the teams; 2) basket average between the teams; 3) general basket average within the group.
 The top four teams from each group qualified for a 1/8 Final Playoff (X-pairings, home and away games), while the winners advanced further to 1/4 Finals and 1/2 Finals.
 The Final was played at a predetermined venue.

Teams 
The labels in the parentheses show how each team qualified for the place of its starting round:

 1st, 2nd, 3rd, 4th, 5th, etc.: League position after eventual Playoffs
 CW: Cup winners

Regular season

Round of 16

|}

Quarterfinals

|}

Semifinals

|}

Final
April 30, Palais des Sports de Gerland, Lyon

|}

Awards

FIBA Saporta Cup Finals MVP 
 Petar Naumoski ( Montepaschi Siena)

See also
2001–02 Euroleague
2001–02 FIBA Korać Cup

References

External links
  2001–02 FIBA Saporta Cup @ FIBA Europe.com
 2001–02 FIBA Saporta Cup at Linguasport

Saporta Cup
2001-02